is a Japanese handball player who plays for the club Hokkoku Bank. She is also member of the Japanese national team. She competed at the 2015 World Women's Handball Championship in Denmark.

References

1988 births
Living people
Japanese female handball players
Asian Games medalists in handball
Handball players at the 2014 Asian Games
Asian Games silver medalists for Japan
Medalists at the 2014 Asian Games
20th-century Japanese women
21st-century Japanese women